Dale McCullers (born October 11, 1947) is a former American football linebacker. He played for the Miami Dolphins in 1969.

References

1947 births
Living people
American football linebackers
Florida State Seminoles football players
Miami Dolphins players